John Yates is a New Zealand former rugby league footballer who represented New Zealand in two World Cups. His brother, Victor, was a New Zealand rugby union representative and played rugby league for Auckland while his father, Moses, represented North Auckland in rugby union.

Playing career
Yates originally played rugby union, playing his first senior game for Rarawa and was chosen for North Auckland.

In 1953 Yates switched codes and he quickly became an Auckland representative and first played for the New Zealand national rugby league team in 1954. He was part of both the 1954 and 1957 World Cup squads.

In 1958 he was part of Auckland Rugby League's first ever Grand Final, being part of the Otahuhu Leopards side that lost 7-16 to Ponsonby.

References

Living people
New Zealand rugby league players
New Zealand national rugby league team players
Auckland rugby league team players
Otahuhu Leopards players
Rugby league props
Rugby league second-rows
New Zealand rugby union players
New Zealand Māori rugby league players
Year of birth missing (living people)